Eda is a name that has arisen independently in multiple regions. 

Its oldest appearance dates back to the ancient Albanian tribes of Illyrian Peninsula (today's Balkan) and Language with meaning E-DA / E-DHA meaning WAS-GIVEN. Eda is also a popular female first name in Turkey meaning manner and expression.
Also Old Norse, and subsequently, Old English language, with meaning "strife for wealth").  Eda was a goddess in northern mythology, the Guardian of Time and Wealth. Also a variant of Edith, Edna and Hedwig. It is sometimes considered the shortened version of the male name "Edwin".
Eda has 2 variant forms: Edda and Ede.
In the United States, Eda is a fairly common first name for women (#1953 out of 4276) but an uncommon surname or last name for all people.
Eda and Edda were popular in Italy before the fall of Fascism, as Mussolini's daughter was named Edda.

In Japan it is a common last name (see Eda (surname)). Eda also appears high in name rankings for Scandinavian states such as Sweden.

People
Notable people with the given name Eda include:

 Eda Ahi (born 1990), Estonian poet, translator and diplomat
 Eda Ece (born 1990), Turkish actress
 Eda Erdem Dündar (born 1987), Turkish volleyball player
 Eda Karataş (born 1995), Turkish footballer
 Eda Kersey (1904–1944), British violinist 
 Eda LeShan (1922–2002), American writer, television host, counselor, educator, and playwright
 Eda Hurd Lord (1854–1938), American businesswomen
 Eda Lord Dixon (1876–1926); American metal artist; daughter of Eda Hurd Lord
 Eda Nolan (born 1988), Filipina actress
 Eda Özerkan (born 1984), Turkish actress
 Eda Rapoport (1890–1968), Jewish-American composer and pianist of Latvian origin
 Eda Rivas (born 1952), Peruvian lawyer and politician
 Eda Tuğsuz (born 1997), Turkish track and field athlete
 Eda Warren (1903–1980), American film editor
 Eda Zoritte (born 1926), Israeli writer, essayist, playwright, translator and poet

Fictional characters
 Eda Clawthorne, a character in the American animated fantasy TV series The Owl House

Notes

Think baby names. Eda
Nordic Names. Eda

Feminine given names
Turkish feminine given names